Falsamblesthis is a genus of longhorn beetles of the subfamily Lamiinae, containing the following species:

 Falsamblesthis candicans (Gounelle, 1910)
 Falsamblesthis gracilis (Lameere, 1893)
 Falsamblesthis ibiyara Marinoni, 1978
 Falsamblesthis macilenta (Gounelle, 1910)
 Falsamblesthis microps Martins & Galileo, 1992
 Falsamblesthis pilula Galileo & Martins, 1987
 Falsamblesthis seriepilosa (Kirsch, 1889)
 Falsamblesthis taeniata (Belon, 1903)
 Falsamblesthis unguicularis (Tippmann, 1960)

References

Forsteriini